Zafar Safar oglu Guliyev (born June 17, 1972, in Lüvəsər, Azerbaijani SSR) is a Russian wrestler of Azerbaijani descent, who won a bronze medal at the 1996 Summer Olympics.

References
 sports-reference

External links
 

1972 births
Living people
Azerbaijani emigrants to Russia
Azerbaijani male sport wrestlers
Olympic wrestlers of Russia
Wrestlers at the 1996 Summer Olympics
Russian male sport wrestlers
Olympic bronze medalists for Russia
Olympic medalists in wrestling
World Wrestling Championships medalists
Medalists at the 1996 Summer Olympics
European Wrestling Championships medalists